The Five Fingers of Tibet is a Chinese foreign policy attributed to Mao Zedong that considers Tibet to be China's right hand palm, with five fingers on its periphery: Ladakh, Nepal, Sikkim, Bhutan, and North-East Frontier Agency (now known as Arunachal Pradesh), that it is China's responsibility to "liberate" these regions. It was never discussed in official Chinese public statements, but external concerns have been raised over its possible continued existence or revival. An article in a provincial mouthpiece magazine of the Chinese Communist Party verified the existence of this policy in the aftermath of the 2017 China–India border standoff.

Background
Imperial China claimed suzerainty over Nepal, Sikkim, and Bhutan as an extension of its claim over Tibet. These claims were asserted by the Chinese amban in Tibet in 1908, who wrote to the Nepalese authorities that Nepal and Tibet, "being united like brothers under the auspices of China, should work in harmony for mutual good." He suggested the "blending of five colours" representing China, Tibet, Nepal, Sikkim, and Bhutan as part of his program to assert the Chinese claim in the face of British opposition. On 15 November 1939, the founding chairman of the Chinese Communist Party (CCP), Mao Zedong termed Bhutan and Nepal as China's tributary states.

Origin
The "Five Fingers of Tibet" policy has been widely attributed to Mao's speeches in the 1940s, but has never been discussed in official Chinese public statements. This construct considered Tibet to be the palm of China's right hand, with Ladakh, Nepal, Sikkim, Bhutan, and North-East Frontier Agency (now known as Arunachal Pradesh) being its five fingers. In 1954, Chinese officers in Tibet claimed that they would "liberate Sikkim, Bhutan, Ladakh, and the NEFA, which were wrongfully being held by the Indian imperialists." In the same year, the Chinese government published a book called "A Brief History of Modern China" for school students, which included a map showing the territories allegedly taken by "imperialist powers" between 1840 and 1919, terming them as "portions of China that must be reclaimed." This map included Ladakh, Nepal, Bhutan, Sikkim, and the entire Northeast India. This was also noted in the memoirs of Indian diplomat Triloki Nath Kaul who was serving in Peking (now known as Beijing) at that time. Scholar B. S. K. Grover said that this map was a "serious reflection of Peking's ambitions" and not mere propaganda or "idle-boasting".

The claims over the "five fingers" were asserted "emphatically and frequently" from 1958 to 1961 over the Peking and Lhasa radio systems. During a mass meeting in Lhasa in July 1959, Chinese lieutenant general Zhang Guohua said: "Bhutanese, Sikkimese and Ladakhis form a united family in Tibet. They have always been subject to Tibet and to the great motherland of China. They must once again be united and taught the communist doctrine."

Relevance to 21st century policy
The policy, which was never discussed in Chinese public statements, is officially dormant now. The Chinese claims remain only on the Indian state of Arunachal Pradesh and the Aksai Chin region that India claims as part of Ladakh but has been under Chinese administration since the late 1950s. However, fears have been expressed regarding its revival.

After the 2017 China–India border standoff at Doklam, an article in Qunzhong (mouthpiece magazine of CCP's Jiangsu provincial party standing committee) invoked the "five fingers" construct. The article, which was written by Nanjing University researcher Liu Litao, alleged that India's covert support to the Tibetan independence movement stems from the fact that it was impossible to fully control the "five fingers" that India had allegedly taken away without the "palm". The Tibetan culture was said to be the "centripetal force" on the "five fingers". The article added that as China's investments, trade, and economic relations with these regions increase, the Chinese influence in these regions will overtake that of India and will eliminate it to a "great extent".

Lobsang Sangay, the leader of the Central Tibetan Administration, linked the policy with the Doklam standoff. He also cited it as the reason behind the 2020 China–India skirmishes, Adhir Ranjan Chowdhury (Indian National Congress leader in the Indian Parliament), Seshadri Chari (former foreign affairs cell head of the Bharatiya Janata party), and M. M. Khajuria (former Director General of Police of Jammu and Kashmir) have also voiced similar views.

According to commentator Saurav Jha, the "five fingers" policy arises from the historical geography of the Himalayas which allows bi-directional territorial claims between Tibet and the southern regions. This leads to tensions between the trans-Himalayan powers which is "ultimately tempered by a balance of military capability," and is the reason behind the longstanding Sino-Indian border dispute.

See also
 Chinese expansionism
 Chinese salami slicing strategy

Notes

References

Foreign policy doctrines
Bhutan–China relations
China–India relations
China–Nepal relations
Territorial disputes of China